Nijhuizum is a village in Súdwest-Fryslân in the province of Friesland, the Netherlands with a population of around 55 in January 2017.

History
The village was first mentioned in 1449 as Nyahusen, and means new houses. Nijhuizum is surrounded by lakes and can only be accessed by car from a dead-end road from Workum. There is a ferry for pedestrians and cyclists to Gaastmeer.

The Dutch Reformed church dates from 1721, and is a replacement of a 13th century predecessor. 

Nijhuizum was home to 70 people in 1840. Before 2011, the village was part of the Nijefurd municipality and before 1984 it belonged to Wymbritseradiel.

Gallery

References

External links

Súdwest-Fryslân
Populated places in Friesland